Charles Lauth (1836–1913) was a French chemist. He synthesised methyl violet.

In 1883 he was elected president of the Chemical Society of France.

References

19th-century French chemists
Scientists from Strasbourg
1836 births
1913 deaths